"Gust of Wind" is a song written, produced, and performed by American musician Pharrell Williams. Written alongside Daft Punk (who also provided vocals), it was released on October 24, 2014 by Columbia Records as the fourth single from Williams's second studio album Girl (2014).

Williams' fifth collaboration with Daft Punk, The Neptunes completed a remix for Daft Club (2003), Daft Punk had previously co-written and co-produced the song "Hypnotize U" from N.E.R.D's fourth studio album Nothing (2010) and Williams provided vocals on "Get Lucky" and "Lose Yourself to Dance" from Daft Punk's fourth and final studio album Random Access Memories (2013).

Music video
The official music video was directed by Edgar Wright (Shaun of the Dead, Hot Fuzz, Baby Driver). It was released on October 7, 2014. The video depicts Williams dancing with women in a forest in autumn, with Daft Punk represented by stone sculptures of their helmets.

Live performances
On October 12, 2014, Williams performed "Gust of Wind" on the first live results show of The X Factor.

Charts

Release history

References

2014 songs
2014 singles
Pharrell Williams songs
Song recordings produced by Daft Punk
Song recordings produced by Pharrell Williams
Songs written by Pharrell Williams
Songs written by Thomas Bangalter
Songs written by Guy-Manuel de Homem-Christo
Columbia Records singles
Music videos directed by Edgar Wright
Funk songs